Winding Road is the twenty-first single by the Japanese Pop-rock band Porno Graffitti. It was released on October 4, 2006.

used as the ending theme of the Mainichi Broadcasting System and TBS anime series Ayakashi Ayashi.

Track listing

References

2006 singles
Porno Graffitti songs
SME Records singles
2006 songs
Oricon Weekly number-one singles